was a Japanese video game developer and publisher headquartered in Shibuya, Tokyo, founded in 2007 as a joint venture between Sony and Bandai Namco Holdings. The aim of the company was to "help take share from Microsoft Corp. and Nintendo Co." Sony hoped that the company would make up for the losses it made during quarter two of its financial year. Ken Kutaragi was announced as CEO. Bandai Namco Holdings held 51% of the company, and Sony held 49%. The company planned to use Sony's Cell microprocessor, the heart of the PlayStation 3, for PlayStation 3 games and games for mobile phones and personal computers. Its only video game project was the poorly-received Ridge Racer on the PlayStation Vita.

Notes

References

External links
Cellius web site

Video game companies of Japan
Sony Interactive Entertainment
Video game development companies
Japanese companies established in 2007
Video game companies established in 2007
Video game companies disestablished in 2012
Japanese companies disestablished in 2012
Former Bandai Namco Holdings subsidiaries
Cell BE architecture
Software companies based in Tokyo
Shibuya
Defunct video game companies of Japan
Joint ventures